Design Center Colorado is situated within the Department of Mechanical Engineering at the University of Colorado Boulder. Design Center (DC) Colorado is dedicated to fostering partnerships between students, industry, government agencies, and other organizations. This is done by immersing teams of graduate and undergraduate students in externally sponsored design projects throughout the academic year.

Since 2000, the Design Center, part of the I/UCPC, or the Industry/University Cooperative Projects Center,  has had over 1600 student participants that have worked on 225 projects from 56 different organizations. Design Center projects require that at least 1500 student hours are put in per project.

Undergraduate Program
The CU-Boulder ME undergraduate degree includes a variety of design classes, starting with a freshman Computer Aided Design (CAD) course and culminating with a year-long Senior Design experience. Senior Design is the culminating design experience in the Mechanical Engineering (ME) Department at CU-Boulder. The purpose of this course is to simulate an entry-level engineering project in industry—allowing students to apply the engineering knowledge they acquired in the fundamental ME courses to a real-world, open-ended design challenge. Graduates of CU's ME department are expected to have a firm grasp of the design process and first-hand experience executing the design loop in both theoretical and real-life settings.

Graduate Program
The Graduate Design Program is focused on educating graduate (both Masters and Doctoral) students through hands-on design learning and industry-sponsored projects. The cornerstone of this program is a three-semester sequence of courses that begin in January, and culminate the following year in May. The first course in this sequence is Advanced Product Design (APD).  Advanced Product Design, focuses on the design and development of consumer products such as bicycles, climbing gear, power tools, etc. Through a review of existing products, high-level frameworks, and hands-on design assignments, the course is designed to give an overview of the processes and methods students need to design products. Following the APD studio class, a two-semester Graduate Design project follows.

Graduate Design consists of teams of 3-4 students working on a design project:  the result of this project is a piece of fully tested functional hardware with accompanying documentation. In many cases, the project hardware will be representative of the final manufactured product. While the course focuses on team design projects, formal class time discussions center on design heuristics, project management, design trends, failure mode and effects analysis (FMEA), entrepreneurship, and oral presentation skills. Projects come from various sources such as industry, non-profit organizations, student concepts for an entrepreneurship product, technology transfer, corporate grants, etc.

Sponsors
The Design Center (DC) Colorado fosters technical collaborations with business, industry, and non-profit organizations. Projects have incorporated many different subject areas including bio-medical, computers & peripherals, aerospace, automotive, energy, sports and recreation, government research, and packing and measurement. Student teams work on assigned projects for two consecutive semesters and deliver tested, functional hardware and documentation to the industry sponsor after the project. Past sponsors have included: Agilent, Boeing, ConMed, Covidien, Hewlett-Packard, TerumoBCT, Medtronic, MillerCoors, Ricoh, Sandia National Labs, Shell, Oracle, and Los Alamos National Lab.

Facilities
The DC Colorado program is primarily housed in the Mechanical Engineering department, in the Engineering Building, on the University of Colorado Boulder campus. The Fleming Building will be renovated into the Idea Forge, the new home of Design Center Colorado on the university's campus.

The Durning Laboratory, which will also move to the Idea Forge, is the dedicated design space for undergraduate mechanical engineering students. With more than 6,000 sq ft, the laboratory is home to student project work areas, material testing instrumentation, composites fabrication space, the ME student machine shop, and an ME student computer lab. Durning Laboratory also provides essential tools for checkout to ME students, including hand tools, measurement devices, fasteners, adhesives, reference materials, electronic components, and a high-speed camera.

FALL is a dedicated Graduate Design Program space in the Fleming Law building. These facilities are used exclusively by the students in the Graduate Design Program. This space includes a dedicated computer laboratory, conference room, active learning classroom, mechanical fabrication room, electrical fabrication room, multi-use lounge area, and individual team studios for Grad Design.

References

University of Colorado Boulder
Design schools in the United States
Engineering education in the United States